Abdikarim Hussein Guled is a Somali politician. He previously served as Minister of Interior and Minister of National Security of Somalia. On 4 July 2015 he was elected as the 5
4th president of Galmudug State of Somalia

Biography

Early years 
Guled was born in 1966 in the town of Beledweyne, situated in the central Hiran region of Somalia to parents who hailed from Galmudug state of Somalia. He is a schoolteacher by profession.

Education 
Guled is a graduate from the Department of Management at the University of Science and Technology in Yemen

Career 
From 4 November 2012 to 17 January 2014, he served as the Minister of Interior and Security of Somalia under Prime Minister Abdi Farah Shirdon. Guled's term ended when new Prime Minister Abdiweli Sheikh Ahmed named him the Minister of the newly formed Ministry of National Security.

On 24 May 2014, Guled resigned as National Security Minister following an attack by the Al-Shabaab militant group on the parliamentary building in Mogadishu. Prime Minister Abdiweli Sheikh Ahmed approved Guled's resignation letter and was expected to appoint a new minister to the position. On 4 July 2015. On 9 July 2014, Khalif Ahmed Ereg was appointed Minister of National Security of Somalia by Prime Minister Abdiweli Sheikh Ahmed.

Guled defeated Ahmed Mo'alim Fiqi and was elected the president of the Galmudug region.

Peace Treaty 
On 2 December 2015, Guled cosigned the Gaalkacyo Agreement with the President of Puntland Abdiweli Mohamed Ali. Although in this agreement, both presidents agreed to a ceasefire and the withdrawal of military troops, the conflict in Galkacyo continued onwards, as of October 2016.

References 

Presidents of Galmudug
Government ministers of Somalia
Living people
1966 births
People from Beledweyne
Somalian educators
University of Science and Technology, Sanaa alumni
21st-century Somalian people
20th-century Somalian people